WLQI (97.7 FM, "The Q") is a radio station broadcasting a classic rock format. Licensed to Rensselaer, Indiana, the station serves the areas of Rensselaer, Indiana and Roselawn, Indiana, and is owned by Brothers Broadcasting Corporation. WLQI is licensed to broadcast with an effective radiated power up to 6,000 watts using an antenna height of 91 meters.

References

External links
WLQI Facebook Page

LQI